The tenth generation of the Ford Thunderbird is a personal luxury car that was produced by Ford for the 1989 to 1997 model years. It was introduced on December 26, 1988 as a 1989 model alongside its sister car, the Mercury Cougar. Developed on Ford's new MN12 (Mid-Size North American Project 12) platform from the second quarter of 1984 (production approved in mid-1985), the new Thunderbird featured a more aerodynamic body that was slightly shorter in overall length relative to the 1988 Thunderbird but had a nine-inch-longer wheelbase.

With the exception of the 1955 model, the Thunderbird traditionally used no "FORD" exterior badging of any kind.  For this generation only, the Ford Blue Oval emblem was used on the trunklid.

Model year changes and design

The car featured four-wheel independent suspension, with short-and-long arms (SLA) and a spring strut assembly in the front and multiple links in the rear, that offered excellent handling and ride quality. This setup was significant as it made the Thunderbird, the Lincoln Mark VIII, and the Cougar the only rear-wheel drive North American domestic cars other than the Chevrolet Corvette to offer a four-wheel independent suspension at the time. Engine options fell to only two for 1989 as Ford dropped the V8 option for the new Thunderbird which would return later for the 1991 model year. The base and LX models were powered by Ford's 3.8 L Essex OHV V6. This engine was mated to Ford's AOD 4-speed automatic transmission regardless of trim level from the 1989 to 1993 model years. Due in part to its low coefficient of drag, the Thunderbird was relatively fuel efficient considering its overall size and weight. The fuel efficiency rating was noticeably better than that of Thunderbirds equipped with higher performance engines and gave the base V6-equipped Thunderbird a significant driving range with its 19 gallon fuel tank (later decreased to 18 gallons).

A more sophisticated, supercharged and intercooled version of the 3.8 L OHV V6 was used to power the high performance Thunderbird Super Coupe, also called Thunderbird SC for short. The Super Coupe could be had with a Mazda-derived, M5R2 5-speed manual transmission or an AOD 4-speed automatic transmission (or 4R70W for 1994/1995 models). The Thunderbird Super Coupe was Motor Trend's Car of the Year for 1989, which Ford proudly advertised. Accompanying the more powerful engine, Super Coupes were equipped with a host of unique features underlining their higher performance demeanor relative to standard Thunderbirds. Among these were larger, 16 x 7.0 inch alloy wheels with high performance tires (standard Thunderbirds came with 15 x 6.0 inch steel wheels and 15 x 6.5 inch alloy wheels were optional), a Traction-Lok limited slip differential, standard anti-lock brakes, 4-wheel disc brakes (vented front and rear rotors), speed-sensitive variable assist steering, lower body side cladding, fog lights, and a stiffer suspension with adjustable shocks supplied by Tokico.

In spite of the new Thunderbird's merits, it was considered a failure by Ford's top management. On January 17, 1989, then Ford President Harold A. Poling, with Ford CEO Donald Petersen and Ford Executive Vice President Phil Benton looking on, harshly criticized the MN12 program's staff in a meeting for badly missing the Thunderbird and Cougars' weight and cost targets ( heavier and  more per car than planned). This criticism came as a surprise to the program staff who expected to be praised for the Thunderbird and Cougars' technical achievements and positive reception. Anthony "Tony" S. Kuchta, manager of the MN12 program, was angered by Poling, not for his points about weight and cost overruns but rather that he directed his criticism at the program staff instead of at Kuchta who was responsible for all of the important decisions that determined the program's direction. Many of the decisions that Kuchta made regarding the MN12's development that resulted in the weight and cost overruns criticized by Poling were caused by the very things that set the MN12 cars apart from other cars in their class (such as rear-wheel drive and an independent rear suspension). Falling out of favor with Ford management after the Thunderbird and Cougars' launch, Kuchta voluntarily retired early from Ford in May 1989.

For the 1991 model year, Ford reintroduced a V8 option with the 5.0L V8, which included a sports suspension package. Like the standard 3.8 L V6, the V8 was only mated to the AOD 4-speed automatic transmission. On the television program MotorWeek in a review of the 1991 Thunderbird and similar Mercury Cougar, a road test of a V8-equipped Thunderbird revealed that the car could accelerate from 0 to 60 mph in 9.2 seconds; approximately two seconds faster than a standard V6 Thunderbird but about two seconds slower than a Super Coupe.

For 1992, the Thunderbird received its first styling update with a reshaped decklid featuring new LED illuminated taillamp units. A V8 Sport model was offered for this year only featuring the Super Coupe front fascia with fog lamps, lower body accent stripes and an upgraded suspension and handling package.  For 1993, all Thunderbirds used the Super Coupe front fascia.

Mid-cycle refresh 

The Thunderbird received an extensive mid-cycle refresh for 1994, with revisions to powertrain, exterior appearance, addition of safety features, and a total redesign of its interior. 

The front fascia saw substantial styling changes with larger air intakes in the bumper cover, new headlamps, and a new, slightly more curvaceous hood. The Thunderbird emblem was moved from the front edge of the hood to the upper air intake slot in the bumper cover. The interior was completely redesigned to accommodate dual front airbags and to optimize driver comfort and convenience. It featured wrap-around cockpit style instrumentation with a new steering wheel, radio and climate controls, and sweeping curves on the door panels and dashboard surfaces. LX models featured revised seat designs with a choice of new fabric or leather seating surfaces.

Arguably the most dramatic change for 1994, however, was the new 4.6 L Modular SOHC V8 which replaced the "5.0" small block engine. An electronically controlled 4R70W 4-speed automatic transmission replaced the AOD automatic transmission in all instances where it was previously used in the Thunderbird.

This was made possible due to a number of changes. The Eaton M90 roots-type supercharger was given a larger, square style inlet, a larger attaching inlet plenum, and Teflon coated rotors. The engine received larger fuel injectors and an increase in compression to 8.6:1. In their March 1996 issue, Motor Trend magazine conducted a comparison test of a 1995 Thunderbird Super Coupe against the front-wheel drive Chevrolet Monte Carlo Z34 and a Buick Regal Gran Sport. In summarizing the overall performance of each car relative to each other, the author of the article, Don Sherman, wrote, "The Buick Regal is a competent, comfortable car at an attractive price, but it's too androgynous to be called a Gran Sport. Nothing about it is grand, and there isn't a sporting bone in its body. All the Monte Carlo needs to succeed is a V-8 engine and a year of refinement to eradicate its quality bugs. That leaves the Thunderbird SC as this test's big winner. It's a far more sophisticated solution to the four-place-coupe equation, but is priced accordingly." In spite of positive critiques like this, the increases in output and performance over earlier Super Coupes would be short-lived, as the Thunderbird Super Coupe was discontinued after the 1995 model year due to slowing sales.

For 1996, the Thunderbird was offered only as an LX model. The hood, headlamps and bumper fascias were once again restyled. The front fascia received a honeycomb mesh grille, with a revised Thunderbird emblem placed in the center. The headlamps were changed to clear lenses with fluted inner reflector housings. New body colored door handles replaced the former textured black ones and wide body colored cladding was added along the lower bodysides. The lower taillamp trim changed from black to red reflectors (as with former SC models) creating a uniform taillamp appearance, with the "Thunderbird LX" badge relocated to the upper-left of the decklid in a new script font. For 1997, a Sport option package was available for V8 equipped models which included a performance suspension, 16" aluminum wheels and tires and a rear decklid spoiler.

SVE Thunderbird
Toward the end of the MN12 Thunderbird's production run, Ford's Special Vehicle Engineering (SVE) division explored the idea of a new high performance Thunderbird, producing four prototypes. Stylistically the SVE Thunderbirds blended elements from the 1994–1995 and 1996–1997 Thunderbirds along with elements unique to themselves. The SVE Thunderbird used the headlights, door handles, and rear bumper cover from the 1994–1995 Thunderbird and front fascia and body side cladding from the 1996–1997 Thunderbird. Unique to the SVE Thunderbird relative to other Thunderbirds were 17-inch, five spoke Cobra R wheels, larger dual exhaust tips, a different lower section of the front fascia with fog lights, a unique spoiler, and a prominent cowl hood. The most significant difference that set the SVE Thunderbird apart from other Thunderbirds was its supercharged 4.6 L DOHC V8 engine, similar to that later found in the SVT Mustang Cobra. Power was delivered to the wheels via a Tremec T-45 5-speed manual transmission. Stopping the SVE Thunderbird were larger brakes taken from the Mustang Cobra (going along with its Cobra R wheels).

In spite of its potential, this high performance Thunderbird was not meant to be as Ford not only pulled the plug on this project, but on the entire Thunderbird and Cougar line, with the 1997 model year being its last. Three out of four prototypes were destroyed while the sole surviving prototype remains in private ownership.  

On September 4, 1997, the final MN12 Thunderbird was built at Ford's assembly plant in Lorain, Ohio. As it rolled down the assembly line, a sign saying "That's All Folks" adorned the decklid.

Production totals

References

External links

 Thunderbird Cougar Owners Forum

010
Rear-wheel-drive vehicles
1990s cars
Coupés
Motor vehicles manufactured in the United States
Cars introduced in 1988
Personal luxury cars
Cars discontinued in 1997